"That's Old Fashioned (That's the Way Love Should Be)" is a song released in 1962 by The Everly Brothers. The song spent 11 weeks on the Billboard Hot 100 chart, peaking at No. 9, while reaching No. 4 on Billboard's Easy Listening chart, No. 6 in the Philippines, and No. 18 on Canada's CHUM Hit Parade. This song is their last top 10 hit in the United States.

Chart performance

References

1962 songs
1962 singles
The Everly Brothers songs
Songs written by Bernie Baum
Songs written by Bill Giant
Songs written by Florence Kaye
Warner Records singles